Luis Edward Hinestroza Córdoba (born 16 April 1992) is a Colombian professional footballer. His common position is left midfield.

In 2016, Hinestroza was involved in an administrative conflict between the clubs Santa Tecla, Chalatenango and Isidro Metapán, because of a double signature of employment contracts. The result was his suspension, and a fine to the player. Some time later, Hinestroza was able to play again.

References

1992 births
Living people
Colombian footballers
Boyacá Chicó F.C. footballers
San Luis F.C. players
Club Tijuana footballers
Tecos F.C. footballers
Nueva Chicago footballers
Santa Tecla F.C. footballers
Colombian expatriate footballers
Expatriate footballers in Mexico
Expatriate footballers in Argentina
Expatriate footballers in El Salvador
Association football forwards
Expatriate footballers in Egypt
Al Mokawloon Al Arab SC players
Egyptian Premier League players
Footballers from Cali